Ghora Gali is one of the tourist mountain resort towns of the Galyat area of northern Pakistan. It has an elevation of 1691m and is located in the northeastern tip of the Punjab province of Pakistan. According to the 1998 census of Pakistan it had a population of 14410.

History

British Era
Ghora Gali served as a resort for British colonialists and troops during the British Raj. In 1860 the Lawrence College was established here originally as an asylum for orphans of British troops killed in the wars. Also in 1860 the Murree Brewery was established here and produced beer for British troops, however in 1947 following independence from Britain and the ensuing riots during the independence of Pakistan in 1947 the building was destroyed.

Recreation
Ghora Gali now features an 1,100 m long chairlift. It goes from Ghora Gali to Pindi Point.

See also
 Lawrence College Ghora Gali

References

Hill stations in Pakistan
Populated places in Murree District
Galyat of Pakistan